The Vanderhall Carmel is a three-wheeled roadster produced by the American vehicle manufacturer Vanderhall Motor Works.

History 
The two-seater was introduced in 2019 and is priced above Vanderhall Venice. From 2020, Vanderhall models will also be launched in Germany. The basic model is the  Blackjack  with a shortened windshield and black trim. The more expensive models can have, among other things, leather interiors, paddle shifters and a standard cap shade.

The model is named after the small town of Carmel-by-the-Sea in California.

References 

Roadsters
Sports cars
Three-wheeled motor vehicles
Cars introduced in 2019
2010s cars
2020s cars
Carmel